Florent Massip (born 29 March 1994) is a French rugby union full-back and he currently plays for Provence Rugby in the French [[Pro D2
]].

References

External links
Provence profile
L'Équipe profile

1994 births
Living people
French people of Réunionnais descent
French rugby union players
Rugby union fullbacks
Provence Rugby players
Black French sportspeople
Sportspeople from Saint-Denis, Réunion
Stade Montois players